Bernd Müller (born 25 April 1963) is a German football manager and former player.

Müller comes from a footballing family, his father Heini played in the Bundesliga for 1. FC Nürnberg and his son, Jim-Patrick (born 1989), plays for SpVgg Unterhaching.

References

External links 
 

1963 births
Living people
German footballers
Association football forwards
2. Bundesliga players
1. FC Nürnberg II players
FC Bayern Munich II players
SpVgg Unterhaching players
SpVgg Greuther Fürth players
German football managers